The L&YR Class 30 was a class of 0-8-0 steam locomotives of the Lancashire and Yorkshire Railway. The class was designed by John Aspinall and introduced in 1900.

Hoy locomotives

Twenty of the class, built in 1903, were fitted with Henry Hoy's corrugated cylindrical steel firebox. This was not a great success (the internal flue deformed under steam pressure and water circulation was poor) and they were later rebuilt with conventional boilers between 1911 and 1914. Crews referred to them as "Sea Pigs" which infers they were not well liked.

Numbering
A total of 60 locomotives were built, all of which passed to the London, Midland and Scottish Railway (LMS) in 1923. The LMS numbered them 12700-12759 and gave them the power classification 5F. By 1948, British Railways (BR) inherited only one surviving locomotive: LMS No. 12727 (L&YR No. 1433), which was renumbered 52727.

Withdrawal
The first locomotive was withdrawn in 1926 and the last in 1950. None were preserved.

References

0-8-0 locomotives
30
Railway locomotives introduced in 1900
Standard gauge steam locomotives of Great Britain
Scrapped locomotives